The following is a list of notable events and releases of the year 1981 in Norwegian music.

Events

April
 10 – The 8th Vossajazz started in Voss, Norway (April 10 – 12).

May
 20 – 9th Nattjazz started in Bergen, Norway (May 20 – June 3).

Albums released

Unknown date

A
 The Aller Værste!
 Disniland I De Tusen Hjem (Den Gode Hensikt)

G
 Jan Garbarek
 Folk Songs (ECM Records), with Charlie Haden, and Egberto Gismonti
 Eventyr (ECM Records), with Nana Vasconcelos, Palle Danielsson, and John Abercrombie
 Nude Ants (ECM Records), with Keith Jarrett, Palle Danielsson, and Jon Christensen

K
 Karin Krog
 I Remember You (Spotlite Records)

R
 Terje Rypdal
 To Be Continued (ECM Records)

S
 Thorgeir Stubø
 Notice (ECM Records)
 Øystein Sunde
 Barkebille Boogie (Philips Records)

V
 Jan Erik Vold
 Stein. Regn (PolyGram Records), with Kåre Virud and Telemark Blueslag

Deaths

 February
 1 – Geirr Tveitt, composer and pianist (born 1908).

 May
 22 – Reimar Riefling, classical pianist, music teacher, and music critic (born 1898).

Births

 February
 2 – Julian Berntzen, vocalist, pianist, violinist and composer.

 March
 18 – Ingrid Olava, singer, pianist, and songwriter.
 25 – Cato Sundberg, vocalist, guitarist, and songwriter, Donkeyboy.

 April
 7 – Amund Maarud, blues and rock guitarist.
 27 – Hilde Marie Kjersem, singer and songwriter.

 June
 16 – Ola Kvernberg, jazz violinist and composer.

 July
 13 – Sigurd Hole, jazz upright bassist , Eple Trio.
 28 – Lars Fredrik Frøislie, vocalist, keyboardist and drummer.
 29 – Gjermund Larsen, traditional folk music violinist and composer.

 August
 3 – Erlend Tvinnereim, operatic tenor.

 October
 24
 Fredrik Mikkelsen, jazz guitarist.
 Lucy Swann, English musician, vocalist, and composer, living in Norway.
 26 – Erlend Slettevoll, jazz pianist and keyboarder.
 28 – Andreas Loven, jazz pianist.
 29 – Lene Alexandra, singer and model.

 November

 December
 17 – Kim Myhr, jazz guitarist.
 20 – John Olav Nilsen, vocalist and songwriter, John Olav Nilsen & Gjengen.
 24 – Solveig Heilo, composer and percussionist, Katzenjammer.

 Unknown date
 Ivar Loe Bjørnstad, jazz and rock drummer.
 Todd Terje, DJ, songwriter, and record producer.

See also
 1981 in Norway
 Music of Norway
 Norway in the Eurovision Song Contest 1981

References

 
Norwegian music
Norwegian
Music
1980s in Norwegian music